Tatsiana Klimovich (born 19 January 1995) is a Belarusian rower. She competed in the 2020 Summer Olympics.

References

1995 births
Living people
Sportspeople from Gomel
Rowers at the 2020 Summer Olympics
Belarusian female rowers
Olympic rowers of Belarus